Mehrdad Nosrati (born December 24, 1974, in Tehran) is an Iranian composer, arranger and singer. In his artistic career, he has a history of collaborating with prominent singers such as Nasser Abdollahi, Reza Sadeghi, RoozbehNematOlahi, Behnam Safavi, Saeed Shahrooz, Amir Tajik, Ehsan KhajehAmiri

Life 
Mehrdad Nosrati was born on January 24, 1974, in Tehran (Piroozi St., Coca-Cola). He was born into a middle-class family. His father was a carpenter and his mother a housewife. He has two brothers and two sisters and is the second child in the family. In 1980, they emigrated to Hamedan and in 1984, he became acquainted with music. The whole family was interested in music and art and was always encouraged, so his brother Mohammad Nosrati started learning music before him. He started with flute and then alto and soprano saxophone; And he learned very quickly and in 1987 he won the first place in playing the saxophone at the Ramsar Festival. [5] He went to the front and performed in Sardasht, Baneh, Ahvaz, Abadan and Susangard with his brother and the Hamedan Military Orchestra. In high school, he participated in provincial anthem competitions every year by forming a choir at school and won several prizes; He performed in various ceremonies and programs. He became acquainted with the theater around 1987. He started acting and performing music in the theater and was involved in composing play music for many years. He composed music in the show and began to shine.

From 1371 to 1374, he won the award for best composition at the National Festival of Children and Adolescents

In the same years, he became acquainted with the Young Filmmakers Association, and because he was very interested in making film music, he sounded and composed for short and semi-long films of eight and sixteen millimeters. In 1372, he received the award for the best music and voice for the film "sokhanrani" made by Hassan Solhjoo.

Albums 
Under the Sky City (Amir Tajik 2002)

Scent of sultry (Nasser Abdollahi Zelf Raha 2002)

Air of Eve (Nasser Abdollahi Bi Hemta 2003)

Mandegar (Nasser Abdollahi 2006)

New Season (Ehsan Khajeh Amiri 2008)

A memory of tomorrow (Ehsan Khajeh Amiri 1389)

Autumn Alone (Ehsan Khajeh Amiri 2014)

Activity

References

1974 births
Living people
Iranian singer-songwriters